Someday is the second album by Korean duo male group J-Walk. Korean male duo, Kim Jae Duc and Jang Su Won (former Sechskies members)is back with their Vol. 2 Someday. The album was released in October 2002, seven months after the first album. The featured song "Someday"  contains fusion-style jazz and bossa flavors, with a sweet melody. The string part is performed by Korean top musicians. This album, again, is produced by Ahn Sung-Il, who was in charge of their debut album Suddenly.

According to Recording Industry Association of Korea, as of the end of December 2002, the album has sold a cumulative total of 54,410 copies. This album consolidate their position so they won SBS Gayo Daejeon Popularity Award with former Sechs Kies member Kang Sunghun in 2002.

Track listing

References

 

2002 albums
J-Walk (South Korean band) albums